Tharros I Alitheia may refer to:

Music
Tharros I Alitheia (Tamta album), an album by Greek singer Tamta
Tharros I Alitheia (song), the title track of the album